Bliss-stick is a company that makes whitewater kayaks. The company is based in Pukeokahu in the Rangitikei District. Once a significant exporter, in 2014 they had turned to domestic production due to exchange rates.

References

Kayak manufacturers
Sporting goods manufacturers of New Zealand
New Zealand brands